Nanas may refer to:

 Nanas, Iran, a village in West Azerbaijan Province
 Les Nanas, a 1985 French comedy film with an entirely female ensemble
 Nanas (flamenco palo) a flamenco musical form 
 Nanas, a series of sculptures by Niki de Saint Phalle

See also
Nana (disambiguation)